Viennese Nights is a 1930 American all-talking pre-Code musical operetta film directed by Alan Crosland and starring Alexander Gray, Vivienne Segal, Walter Pidgeon, Jean Hersholt, Bela Lugosi and Louise Fazenda. It was photographed entirely in Technicolor and released by Warner Brothers. Viennese Nights was the first original operetta written especially for the screen by Oscar Hammerstein II and Sigmund Romberg. It was filmed in March and April 1930, before anyone realized the extent of the economic hardships that would arrive with the Great Depression, which had begun in the autumn of the previous year. Although not a box office hit in the United States, the film had long box office runs in Britain and Australia. It is one of the earliest sound films to have a short pre-credit sequence.

Plot
The film begins in Vienna in the year 1890 and we find that Walter Pidgeon, Alexander Gray and Bert Roach, who are three close friends, are going to join the Austrian army. Eventually, Pidgeon become a lieutenant and as a superior officer he is forced to distance himself from his two former friends. Gray and Pidgeon end up falling in love with a poor girl, played by Vivienne Segal, who is the daughter of a cobbler. Although Segal truly loves Gray, she chooses to marry Pidgeon because of his wealth and position, believing that money and the social mobility that goes with it will bring her happiness. Gray is heartbroken and travels to the United States with his friend Roach. Gray gets a job playing violin in an orchestra but struggles to support his wife and child. In the course of time, Segal travels to the United States and meets Gray and their love is rekindled. Gray learns of Segal's unhappy marriage and they plan to make a new life together. Segal, however, discovers that Gray is married and has a child. Feeling sorry for Gray's son, she sacrifices her happiness and returns to Pidgeon, her husband.

The film now progresses forty years in time to the year 1930. Segal is now a grandmother and she is planning for her granddaughter, played by Alice Day, to marry a wealthy man since the family's fortunes are now on the wane. Day, however, falls in love with a composer, who happens to be the grandson of Gray. Segal immediately recalls her romance with Gray and of the mistake she once made. She consents to her granddaughters marriage and reminiscences about the man she really loves, who is now dead. One day after the wedding, while at the park, Segal sees Gray and her spirit walks off with him and leaves her body. The film ends as she is finally reunited with her long lost love.

Cast

 Alexander Gray as Otto Stirner
 Vivienne Segal as Elsa Hofner 
 Walter Pidgeon as Franz von Renner 
 Jean Hersholt as Herr Hofner, Elsa's father 
 Louise Fazenda as Gretl Kruger 
 Bert Roach as Gus Sascher 
 Alice Day as Barbara, Elsa's granddaughter 
 Philipp Lothar Mayring as Baron von Renner, Franz' father
 June Purcell as Mary, a Singer on the atage
 Milt Douglas as Bill Jones, a Stage Performer

 Freddie Burke Frederick as Otto Stirner Jr.
 Dorothy Hammerstein as Socialite next to Elsa in theatre box 
 Ullrich Haupt as Hugo, Elsa's rejected suitor
 Isabelle Keith as Franz' Rejected Girlfriend 
 Bela Lugosi as Count von Ratz, Hungarian Ambassador 
 Russ Powell as Herr Schultz 
 Virginia Sale as Emma Stirner
 Mary Treen as Shocked Woman on street
 Paul Weigel as Man in Vienna opera box
 Biltmore Trio as Trio in 1930 Nightclub singing "Here We Are"

Production
Viennese Nights was the first of four original screen musicals that the team of Sigmund Romberg and Oscar Hammerstein II were to create for Warner Brothers over a two-year period. They were to be paid $100,000 a piece per film against 25 percent of the profits. This deal was made early in 1930, before anyone realized that the Great Depression would be imminent later that year. These economic problems caused studios to stay away from the lavish spectacle of musicals which were now seen as frivolous and anachronistic. Under these circumstances, Warner Brothers were forced to buy out the contract they had signed with the Romberg-Hammerstein team, early in 1931, after their second musical Children of Dreams (1931), which had already been produced, had been released to dismal reviews.

The picture marked Broadway star Vivienne Segal's last starring role in a picture.  Segal, who was a star on the stage, was trying to be groomed by Warner Brothers as a competitor to Paramount Pictures' Jeanette MacDonald.  Segal's last picture was as a supporting player in MGM's The Cat and the Fiddle, ironically with MacDonald as the star.  Viennese Nights also marked operetta singer Alexander Gray's last starring role in a feature.

Among the players, Bela Lugosi makes his first appearance in color in this feature in a bit part as a Hungarian ambassador named Count von Ratz. Lugosi's part was filmed before his claim to fame as the title role in Dracula for Universal Pictures.

Due to the lack of sets, a number of scenes were filmed at other studios, a common practice at that point.  The climax of the picture, when the symphony is played, was shot on Universal Picture's Stage 28 theater set, originally built for the Lon Chaney picture The Phantom of the Opera.  Viennese Nights marks the third time the set was photographed in Technicolor, the first two being Phantom and The King of Jazz.

Songs
 "You Will Remember Vienna"
 "I Bring a Love Song"
 "When You Have No Man To Love"
 "Goodbye My Love"
 "Here We Are"
 "I'm Bringing You Bad News"
 "I'm Lonely"
 "Oli, Oli, Oli"
 "Otto's Dilemma"
 "Poem Symphonic"
 "Pretty Gypsy"
 "The Regimental March"

Box office
According to Warner Bros records the film earned $343,000 domestic and $607,000 foreign.

Preservation
Unlike most Warner Brothers' early Technicolor films (with a huge number of them existing either only in black and white or are lost completely), Viennese Nights still survives in color. The film survived as a single nitrate Technicolor print in Jack Warner's personal vault on the Burbank lot, and transferred to the UCLA Film and Television Archive, along with the nitrate collection of studio prints. A full set of Vitaphone sound discs was discovered at Warner Bros. in 1988. Additionally, the Vitaphone discs for the Foreign Version (non-dialogue, but English-language songs and musical underscore) has also survived but without picture. The domestic version has been preserved by the UCLA Film and Television Archive, including the overture, intermission, and exit music. The Archive has created a 35mm Eastmancolor preservation negative from that print and the restored showprint has played archival engagements around the world. At the present time the film cannot be shown commercially or on Home Video, without the underlying rights being re-negotiated by the current copyright owner, Warner Bros.

See also
 List of early color feature films

References

External links 

 
 
 

1930 films
1930s color films
1930s historical musical films
American historical musical films
1930s English-language films
Films directed by Alan Crosland
Warner Bros. films
Operetta films
Films set in Vienna
Films set in 1890
Films set in 1930
Early color films
1930s American films